Sittard-Geleen is a municipality in the southeastern Netherlands. It was formed in 2001 from the former municipalities Sittard, Geleen and Born.

The combined municipality has approximately 92,518 inhabitants (March 2019)  and is thus the second most populated municipality in Limburg (after Maastricht with 125,000 inhabitants). Since February 2020, the city has been governed by a coalition of CDA (Christian Democrats), GroenLinks (Green) and the local parties GOB and Stadspartij.

The highway connecting the centres of Sittard and Geleen, the Rijkswegboulevard, has been rebuilt to be a main route for cycling and walking.  The cycling and walking provision is both generous and continuous. Side road junctions, or crossroads, are made 'subordinate'.  The carriageways have been narrowed to one 3m lane in each direction. Parking places have been made, in small groups, at the side of the carriageways.  These are made to be 'not easy to use for larger vehicles' and so the road centre is marked as a place for delivery vehicles to stop. Information supplied by the highway engineers: Büro für Stadt und Verkehr (BSV), Aachen, Germany.

To the west, Sittard-Geleen borders on Belgium, while to the east, it borders on Germany.

Population centres

Born, Broeksittard, Buchten, Einighausen, Geleen, Graetheide, Grevenbicht, Guttecoven, Holtum, Limbricht, Munstergeleen, Windraak, Obbicht, Papenhoven, Schipperskerk and Sittard.

Topography

Dutch Topographic map of the municipality

Notable people 

 Saint Charles of Mount Argus (1821 in Munstergeleen – 1893) a canonized Dutch Passionist priest
 Frederic Adolph Hoefer (1850 in Sittard – 1938) a Dutch lieutenant-general, militaria collector and archivist
 Godfrid Storms (1911 in Sittard – 2003) a Dutch professor of Old and Middle English Literature
 Willy Dols (1911 in Sittard – 1944) a Dutch linguist, dialectologist and phonologist
 Toon Hermans (1916 in Sittard – 2000) a Dutch comedian, singer and writer 
 Settela Steinbach (1934 in Buchten – 1944) a Dutch girl who was gassed in Auschwitz-Birkenau 
 Thea Fleming (born 1942 in Sittard) a Dutch film actress 
 Rein Willems (born 1945 in Geleen) President of Royal Dutch Shell 2003–2007
 Paul Derrez (born 1950 in Sittard) a visual artist, a jewelry designer, gallery owner and collector
 Jan Cremers (born 1952 in Limbricht) a former Dutch politician and sociologist 
 Wim Heldens (born 1954 in Sittard) a Dutch realist painter
 Francine Houben (born 1955 in Sittard) a Dutch architect
 Mike van Diem (born 1959, grew up in Sittard) a Dutch film director 
 Rineke Dijkstra (born 1959 in Sittard) a Dutch portrait photographer
 Laurence Stassen (born 1971 in Sittard) an independent politician and a former freelance TV presenter
 Caspar Poyck (born 1973 in Sittard) a Dutch-American actor, public speaker and chef 
 Myrthe Hilkens (born 1979 in Geleen) a Dutch journalist, non-fiction writer and politician
 Mo'Jones (formed 2000 in Sittard) is a funk, soul and pop band

Sport 

 Leo Horn (1916 in Sittard – 1995) an international football referee, newspaper columnist and textile manufacturer 
 Jan Krekels (born 1947 in Sittard) a retired cyclist, 1968 Olympic champion in the 100 km team time trial
 Huub Stevens (born 1953 in Sittard) a football manager and former defender with 397 club caps
 Wilbert Suvrijn (born 1962 in Sittard) a retired Dutch footballer with 341 club caps
 Lambert Schuurs (born 1962 in Sittard) a retired handball player and ultra-long-distance runner
 Arnold Vanderlyde (born 1963 in Sittard) a former Dutch boxer, who participated in three Summer Olympics (1984, 1988 and 1992) and won three bronze medals
 Wil Boessen (born 1964 in Sittard) a Dutch retired football player with 397 club caps and manager
 Ton Caanen (born 1966 in Geleen) a Dutch football manager.
 Rens Blom (born 1977 in Munstergeleen) a Dutch pole vaulter, competed in the 2000 and 2004 Summer Olympics
 Maartje Paumen (born 1985 in Geleen) a former Dutch field hockey player, twice gold medallist at the 2008 and 2012 Summer Olympics, silver medallist at the 2016 Summer Olympics
 Benjamin van den Broek (born 1987 in Geleen) a New Zealand international footballer with 275 club caps
 Rob Bontje (born 1981 in Grevenbicht) a volleyball player, competed at the 2004 Olympic Games
 Sjoerd Winkens (born 1983 in Geleen) a former professional footballer with over 300 club caps
 Dominick Muermans (born 1984 in Geleen) a Dutch racing driver
 Perr Schuurs (born 1999 in Nieuwstadt) a Dutch football player, playing for Ajax Amsterdam

Notes

References

External links

Official website

 
South Limburg (Netherlands)
Municipalities of Limburg (Netherlands)
Municipalities of the Netherlands established in 2001
Belgium–Netherlands border crossings
Germany–Netherlands border crossings